Parliamentary elections were held in Finland on 1 and 2 July 1951.

Background
Urho Kekkonen of the Agrarian League had served as Prime Minister since March 1950, after losing the February 1950 presidential election to President Juho Kusti Paasikivi.

Kekkonen had governed first with the Swedish People's Party and National Progressive Party, but in January 1951 the Social Democratic Party had joined his government. The rationing of goods was ending gradually and the war reparation payments to the Soviet Union were to be completed by 1952. Prime Minister Kekkonen sought to reduce inflation by persuading the employers' organizations and labour unions to refrain from wage increases for the time being. In May 1951, these organizations agreed not to raise wages or prices for five months.  During this "castle peace" or civic peace, the Social Democrats took most leadership positions in the Central Organisation of Finnish Trade Unions.

The communist Finnish People's Democratic League benefited from the fact that the Social Democrats had agreed to govern with the Agrarians, and had thus "betrayed" (according to some Communists' campaign rhetoric) their fellow left-wingers. The economy's and inflation rate's stabilization possibly hurt the low-income workers (a likely constituency of the Communists) more than the white-collar workers or the businessmen, and this could partly explain the Communists' gain of five deputies. The People's Party of Finland had been formed as the Progressives' successor, and this fresh start can have contributed to its five-seat gain. After the elections, Kekkonen continued to serve as Prime Minister, forming his third government in September 1951.  He introduced a new economic stabilization programme, which tied the prices and wages to an automatic full compensation.

Results

References

General elections in Finland
Finland
Parliament
Finland
Election and referendum articles with incomplete results